A Cooler Climate is a 1999 American made-for-television drama film directed by Susan Seidelman starring Sally Field and Judy Davis. It is based on a book with the same name by Zena Collier and originally aired on Showtime on August 22, 1999.

Award nominations
Sally Field and Judy Davis were both nominated for their performance in the film during the 6th Annual Screen Actors Guild Awards for outstanding performance by a female actor in a television movie or miniseries.  They both also received an Emmy nomination for their performances in the film.

References

External links

1999 television films
1999 films
1999 drama films
Films directed by Susan Seidelman
Films set in Maine
Showtime (TV network) films
American drama television films
1990s English-language films
1990s American films